The 2016 Eastern Michigan Eagles football team represented Eastern Michigan University in the 2016 NCAA Division I FBS football season. They were led by third-year head coach Chris Creighton. The Eagles played their home games at Rynearson Stadium and are members of the West Division of the Mid-American Conference. Coming off of a 1-11 season in 2015, the Eagles performed a remarkable turnaround and finished 7–6, 4–4 in MAC play to finish in fourth place in the West Division. They were invited to the 2016 Bahamas Bowl, just their second bowl game in school history. They also improved their home attendance by over 260% compared to 2015.

Schedule

Game summaries

Mississippi Valley State

at Missouri

at Charlotte

Wyoming

at Bowling Green

Toledo

at Ohio

at Western Michigan

Miami (OH)

at Ball State

Northern Illinois

Central Michigan

vs. Old Dominion–Bahamas Bowl

References

Eastern Michigan
Eastern Michigan Eagles football seasons
Eastern Michigan Eagles football